Ikaros may refer to:

 IKAROS, a Japanese satellite
 Ikaros (island), an island in the Aegean Sea
 Ikaros (Failaka Island), an ancient Greek city in the Persian Gulf
 Ikaros (mythology), a figure in Greek mythology
 Ikaros, a character in Heaven's Lost Property
 Ikaros, a transcription factor encoded by the human IKZF1 gene